Sukuma may refer to:
the Sukuma people
the Sukuma language